Worthing Thunder are a British professional basketball team based in Worthing, West Sussex, England, and compete in the National Basketball League (NBL). The team was originally founded in 1999 as the Worthing Rebels. They swtiched to their current name in 2000. The team has played their home games at the Worthing Leisure Center since their inaugural season.

Franchise history

The early years
Basketball has been played in the town of Worthing since 1984, when Worthing Bears called the Worthing Leisure Centre home (the Thunderdome). In 1999, to build on their popularity and boost commercial revenue the Bears decided to relocate to the nearby city of Brighton, where the franchise had originally started. Disappointed local Bears fans, looking for a new team to follow, quickly snapped up the franchise of struggling Stevenage and in 1999, soon after the Bears had moved out, Worthing Thunder was born.

An excellent debut season, playing as the Worthing Rebels, saw them finish runners up in the National Basketball League Division 1, with a 21–3 record, compared to champions Teesside Mohawks' 22–2 record, as well as reaching the National Trophy final, losing 81–78 to Teesside at the Sheffield Arena in Sheffield. The following year, 2001, saw the Thunder finish again as runners-up in the renamed NBL Conference (16–5) as well as the Playoff final, both times losing out to Plymouth Raiders.

Worthing's first silverware came in 2004 in the form of the National Trophy, a competition they had finished runners up for the two years previous (2002 and 2003). The 86–72 win against the Sutton Pumas at the University of Worcester capped off a less than memorable league campaign, where the team finished 5th in the new English Basketball League Conference (15–7).

The 2004–2005 season saw mild improvement on the league standings, finishing 4th with a less favourable 13–9 record, but the Southerners did reach the National Trophy final for the fourth time in five years, losing out this time to league winners Sheffield Arrows 83–76. However it was the 2005–2006 season that would see Worthing's biggest triumph to date, crowned as EBL Division 1 winners with a 23–3 record. The Championship playoffs were beyond reach though as the Thunder succumbed to second place Reading Rockets in the showpiece final at Birmingham's National Indoor Arena, losing by 4 points 103–99.

The feats of 2005–2006 were surpassed in the following season when as well as defending their league title with a 21–1 record, Thunder reached both the National Cup and National Trophy finals, losing the former to Manchester Magic and the latter to Reading Rockets.  Some element of revenge was gained at the end of the season however, when Worthing defeated Manchester Magic at Newcastle's Metro Radio Arena to claim their first ever play-off Championship title with a 102–94 victory.

On 6 February 2008, it was officially announced that the club would be exchanging hands to a new-look board of directors in a bid to step up to the elite British Basketball League, for the 2008–2009 season. This came just months after the club declined an invitation to compete in the BBL for the 2007–2008 season, a decision which angered some fans and prompted a rival bid for the area franchise from the Brighton Cougars, which eventually failed.

Thunder ended the 2007–2008 rather disappointingly compared to their usually high standards, finishing the League campaign in 3rd place behind rivals Manchester and Reading. After losing not only the National Cup Final 104–89 to Manchester, but also the National Trophy in an 84–68 demolition by Reading, the last chance of silverware was squandered as they fell at the first hurdle in the post-season Play-offs.

However, after years of entertaining the idea of returning top-flight basketball to Worthing, the club felt the time was then right and the decision was made to make the move to the British Basketball League, officially being accepted in May 2008.

Rebrand
On June 5th 2022 Thunder rebranded there logo from the old version and changed the colour scheme from orange and black to navy blue and grey.

Step-up to BBL

Though Coach Gary Smith retained the bulk of Thunder's Division One roster, players such as Dan Wardrope (Guildford Heat) and Lijah Perkins (London Capital) were brought in to give the team much needed top-flight experience. Thunder's campaign tipped-off ironically against an old foe in Plymouth Raiders, who also made the jump from the EBL several years earlier. The game ended in a disappointing 80–104 defeat for Worthing, and it wasn't until the third game, a road trip to Cheshire Jets, that Thunder grabbed their first win in the BBL with a 91–97 victory. Their season was a mixed one overall, and even though they managed to compete with the big-boys – including a 109–99 victory at home to Scottish Rocks and an 85–88 away win at Sheffield Sharks – Worthing finished one-place above bottom London with a 10–23 record.

Home arenas
Worthing Leisure Centre (1999–present)
Durrington High School (2020-2021)

Honours

League
 EBL Division One Winners: 2005/06 & 2006/07 2
 NBL Conference Runners Up: 2000/01 1
 NBL Division One Runners Up: 1999/00 1

Playoffs
 EBL Division One Playoff Winners: 2006/07 1
 EBL Division One Playoff Runners Up: 2005/06 1
 NBL Conference Playoff Runners Up: 2000/01 1

Trophy
 National Trophy Winners: 2003/04 1
 National Trophy Runners Up: 1999/00, 2001/02, 2002/03, 2004/05, 2006/07 & 2007/08 6

Cup
 National Cup Runners up: 2006/07, & 2007/08 2

Players

Current roster

Notable former players

{{Columns-list|colwidth=280px|
  Cameron Hildreth
  Zaire Taylor
  Daniel Hildreth
 Luke Nelson
 Evaldas Zabas
 Jorge Ebanks

Season-by-season records

Notes:
From 2000–2003, the NBL Conference operated as the second tier league, ahead of Division One.
From 2005 onwards, Thunder have regularly participated as an EBL representative in the BBL Trophy, alongside the National Trophy.
From 2008–2011 Worthing competed in the British Basketball League, the country's top tier league.

Junior Team
Worthing Thunder Junior teams have produced many NCAA Division 1 basketball players including Luke Nelson, Cameron Hildreth, Hosana Kitenege, and Blaize Sagna.

Notes

External links
Official Worthing Thunder website

Basketball teams established in 1999
Basketball teams in England
Sport in Worthing
1999 establishments in England